Debra Cecille Magpie Earling (born August 3, 1957 in Spokane, Washington) is a Native American novelist, and short story writer. She is a member of the Bitterroot Salish (tribe). She is the author of Perma Red and The Lost Journals of Sacajewea, which was on display at the Missoula Museum of Art in late 2011. Her work has also appeared in Ploughshares, the Northeast Indian Quarterly, and many anthologies.

Education and Career 
At 18, Earling became the first public defender in the Tribal Justice System of the Flathead Indian Reservation in Montana. She is a graduate of the University of Washington, and holds both an MA in English (1991) and an MFA in Fiction Writing (1992) from Cornell University.

Earling is currently a faculty member in the English Department at the University of Montana at Missoula. In 2016, she became the first Native American director of the University of Montana's creative writing program. She teaches Fiction and Native American Studies.

Works

Perma Red
Earling's first novel, Perma Red, takes place on the Flathead Indian Reservation in the 1940s. Louise White Elk, a determined and beautiful young woman, dreams of escaping and belonging. She comes of age as she is pursued by three dangerous men who will do anything to possess her—police officer Charlie Kicking Woman, the charismatic Baptiste, and Harvey Stoner, who owns nearly everything around him.

This novel won a Spur Award and Medicine Pipe Bearer Award for best first novel from the Western Writers Association, a WILLA Literary Award and the American Book Award. Perma Red touches on the still prevalent crisis of missing and murdered indigenous women in Montana and throughout the West. A team of indigenous and women filmmakers are adapting Perma Red for TV. “Native women need to tell their own stories. Now is the time for those stories to rise. Perma Red is only the beginning," Earling is stated as saying on the fundraising page for the adaption.

The Lost Journals of Sacajewea
This work first began as a project during the bicentennial of the Lewis and Clark expedition and is the result of a five year collaboration between Debra Magpie Earling and artist Peter Koch. The writings are done by Earling, as Koch compiled the historical photographs. The writings, along with the photographs, hope to illustrate native women’s longstanding struggle and desire for freedom through Sacajewea.

Anthologies

Awards
 In January 2019, Perma Red was voted Montana's Best Loved Novel beloved by Montanans through “The Great Montana Read“ program, headed by Montana PBS and Montana Public Radio.
2007 Guggenheim Fellow
 2003 American Book Award
2003 WILLA Literary Award
 2006 NEA grant

Reviews
Debra Magpie Earling's debut novel Perma Red was well reviewed in January Magazine.

References

External links
"Debra Magpie Earling", University of Minnesota

1957 births
20th-century American novelists
American women novelists
20th-century American women writers
American Book Award winners
Cornell University alumni
Living people
Native American academics
Native American women academics
American women academics
Native American novelists
University of Washington alumni
University of Montana faculty
21st-century American women
20th-century Native American women
20th-century Native Americans
Novelists from Washington (state)
Writers from Spokane, Washington
Native American women writers